Khazar Lankaran Central Stadium is a multi-use stadium in Lankaran, Azerbaijan.  It is currently used mostly for football matches and is the home stadium of FK Khazar Lankaran.  The stadium holds 15,000 people and opened in 2006.  The stadium also known as Fırtınalar meydanı (Arena of Storms), named after club's local supporters Fırtına fan group.

On 17 July 2009, UEFA approved the stadium for usage during international football matches. The stadium hosted its first senior international match on 5 September 2009, between Azerbaijan and Finland.

The stadium was one of the venues for the group stages of the 2012 FIFA U-17 Women's World Cup. Two Group matches were played there.

See also
List of football stadiums in Azerbaijan

References

External links
 Khazar Lankaran's Stadium 

Football venues in Azerbaijan